The 19027/19028 Bandra Terminus - Jammu Tawi Vivek Express is an express train of the Vivek Express series belonging to Indian Railways that runs between  and  in India.

Coaches

The train has standard LHB rakes with a max speed of 110 kmph. The train consists of 20 coaches:

 2 AC II Tier
 5 AC III Tier
 8 Sleeper Coaches
 4 General Unreserved
 2 End-on Generator

As with most train services in India, Coach Composition may be amended at the discretion of Indian Railways depending on demand.

Service

The 19027 Bandra Terminus - Jammu Tawi Vivek Express covers the distance of 1881 kilometres in 37 hours 10 mins (51 km/hr) & 1881 kilometres in 36 hours 55 mins (51 km/hr) as 19028 Jammu Tawi - Bandra Terminus Vivek Express.

Routeing

Schedule

Rake Sharing

The train shares its rake with 22949/22950 Bandra Terminus - Delhi Sarai Rohilla Superfast Express.

Direction Reversal

Traction

It is hauled by 2 engines during its run. A Vadodara based  WAP-4E or WAP-5 or WAP-7 hauls the train from Bandra Terminus to Ahmedabad Junction handing over to a Vatva based WDM-3A or WDM-3D until Jammu Tawi.

External links

References 

Transport in Mumbai
Transport in Jammu
Railway services introduced in 2012
Vivek Express trains
Rail transport in Maharashtra
Rail transport in Gujarat
Rail transport in Rajasthan
Rail transport in Haryana
Rail transport in Punjab, India
Rail transport in Jammu and Kashmir